Nobin Islam (born 25 December 1996) is a Bangladeshi first-class cricketer who plays for Rangpur Division.

See also
 List of Rangpur Division cricketers

References

External links
 

1996 births
Living people
Bangladeshi cricketers
Rangpur Division cricketers
People from Dinajpur District, Bangladesh